Tunavallen is a multi-use stadium in Eskilstuna, Sweden.  It is currently used mostly for football matches.  The stadium holds 7,800 seated spectators.

The original stadium was one of the venues for the 1958 FIFA World Cup. It was also the venue for the replay of the Swedish bandy final in 1954. The capacity was 22,000 spectators.

In 2002 a new arena was built. This is the home ground for the football teams AFC Eskilstuna and Eskilstuna City FK.

References

Football venues in Sweden
Bandy venues in Sweden
1958 FIFA World Cup stadiums
Sport in Eskilstuna
Speed skating venues in Sweden
Swedish Bandy Final venues
Eskilstuna City FK
Sports venues completed in 1924
1924 establishments in Sweden